Andrew Jacob Yerzy (born July 5, 1998) is a Canadian professional baseball catcher and first baseman in the Cincinnati Reds organization. He was drafted by the Arizona Diamondbacks in the second round of the 2016 Major League Baseball draft.

Early life
Yerzy, a native of North York, Ontario, was born to David and Patricia (née Wong) Yerzy, has two older brothers, and is Jewish.  His paternal grandparents were Eric Yerzy (whose parents and siblings were murdered in the Holocaust) and Sonia Yerzy. His maternal grandparents were Cheuck Yu Wong and Shun Kiu Susan Wong. He attended York Mills Collegiate Institute in Toronto.

Career

Amateur career

Yerzy was selected for the Junior Canadian National Baseball Team at the age of 15. Yerzy was co-champion of Major League Baseball's Junior Home Run Derby at the 2015 Major League Baseball All-Star Game.

Arizona Diamondbacks
Yerzy was drafted by the Arizona Diamondbacks in the second round of the 2016 Major League Baseball draft, 52nd overall. 
He was the third-highest Major League Baseball draft pick ever from the Greater Toronto Area, behind Josh Naylor (12th overall in 2015 by the Miami Marlins) and Joey Votto (44th overall in 2002 by the Cincinnati Reds). He had signed a letter of intent to attend the University of Notre Dame, but instead signed for a signing bonus of  $1.214 million. It was the 11th-highest bonus ever given a Canadian baseball player.  Arizona scouting director Deric Ladnier said: "He has massive power."

After being drafted, at the age of 17, Yerzy played for both the AZL Diamondbacks and the Missoula Osprey in 2016. He posted a combined .216 batting average with one home run and 16 RBIs in 45 total games between both teams. After the 2016 season, Baseball America ranked him Arizona's #14 prospect. 

He spent 2017 with Missoula. Yerzy greatly improved over his debut, batting .298/.365/.524 with 13 home runs (tied for 6th in the Pioneer League), 45 RBIs and an .890 OPS in 54 games. 

Yerzy played all of 2018 with the Hillsboro Hops, slashing .297/.382/.452 with eight home runs (tied for 8th in the Northwest League), 34 RBIs (9th), and 34 walks (8th) in 63 games. He was both a Northwest League Mid-Season All Star and a Northwest League Post-Season All Star for Hillsboro.

Yerzy split 2019 between the Hillsboro Hops and the Kane County Cougars in the Class A Midwest League, batting a combined .179/.279/.275 with 46 walks, six home runs, and 39 RBIs in 357 at bats. His 34 RBIs and 37 walks with Hillsboro were both 6th in the league. Yerzy did not play in a game in 2020 due to the cancellation of the minor league season because of the COVID-19 pandemic.

As of June 2021, he held every single Hops offensive record. In 2021 Yerzy played with the Class A Visalia Rawhide (12 games), the Class A+ Hillsboro Hops (61 games), and the Class AA Amarillo Sod Poodles (21 games). On May 21, 2021, Yerzy was named Canadian Baseball Network Player of the Week. On August 27, he was named Canadian Baseball Network Player of the Week. He batted a combined .220/.354/.459 in 318 at bats, with 21 home runs, 61 RBIs, 53 walks, 14 hit by pitch, and 7 stolen bases in 8 attempts. In the field, he played catcher (45 games) and first base (24 games).

In 2022, he played the entire season with Amarillo. He batted .220/.338/.402 in 291 at bats, with 45 runs, 12 home runs, 38 RBIs, and 50 walks. In the field, he played first base (48 games) and catcher (31 games), and pitched one scoreless inning in one game. He elected free agency after the 2022 season.

Cincinnati Reds
On March 10, 2023, Yerzy signed a minor league contract with the Cincinnati Reds organization.

International career
Yerzy was selected Canada national baseball team at the 2015 U-18 Baseball World Cup and 2019 Pan American Games Qualifier and 2019 WBSC Premier12.

References

External links

1998 births
Living people
Amarillo Sod Poodles players
Arizona League Diamondbacks players
Baseball catchers
Baseball players from Toronto
Canada national baseball team players
Canadian expatriate baseball players in the United States
Canadian people of Jewish descent
Canadian sportspeople of Chinese descent
Hillsboro Hops players
Jewish baseball players
Kane County Cougars players
Missoula Osprey players
Sportspeople from North York
Visalia Rawhide players
2019 WBSC Premier12 players